Joel Richard Reifman (born 1959) is the U.S. Consul General in Hyderabad since August 20, 2019. Reifman has also been Charge d’ Affaires at the U.S. Embassy in Asmara, Eritrea (July, 2010 until February 2012) Provincial Reconstruction Team Leader in Iraq’s western Anbar province, and an Assistant Staff Judge Advocate in the U.S. Air Force.  

Reifman earned a Bachelor of Arts degree in English literature from the University of Michigan and a Juris Doctor from Southern Methodist University.

References

American consuls
University of Michigan College of Literature, Science, and the Arts alumni
Dedman School of Law alumni
Ambassadors of the United States to Eritrea
21st-century American diplomats